Joop Vermeulen (21 October 1907 – 10 November 1984) was a Dutch long-distance runner. He competed in the marathon at the 1928 Summer Olympics.

References

1907 births
1984 deaths
Athletes (track and field) at the 1928 Summer Olympics
Dutch male long-distance runners
Dutch male marathon runners
Olympic athletes of the Netherlands